Yarine is a village in the Tyre District in South Lebanon, located 19 kilometres south of Tyre. The people of the village are Sunni Muslims.

Name
According to E. H. Palmer in 1881, the name Kh. Yarin comes from "the ruin of Yârîn, p.n."

History
There are remains of a Byzantine church SE of the village site, and a "Tower or fortlet on hill top surrounded by enclosure wall built of large ashlar masonry".

Ottoman era
In 1875, Victor Guérin found here 'On the east extends a sort of avenue, formerly bordered by important buildings. One remarks especially the remains of a great edifice measuring forty-five paces in length from west to east by twenty-two in breadth from north to south. It was built of finely cut stones lying one upon the other with cement, and terminated at the east in three apses, the largest of which, that in the centre, is still partly upright. It was once an ancient church divided into three naves by monolithic columns, some undulated fragments of which are lying on the ground . ….. Small cubes of mosaic in red, white, and black still adhere to the soil in several places.' 
He  further noted: "A large cistern located near this monument to the west was built with great care.
The ruins of Yarin are now inhabited by only three or four Bedouin families, who graze their animals or cultivate a few plots of land."

In 1881, the PEF's Survey of Western Palestine (SWP) found here: “Large ruin; some small-sized drafted stones with bosses left rough, two stones bearing Latin crosses; remains of modern walls and heaps of stones; two rock-cut tombs with square-headed kokim; loculi. In the more eastern one a figure of a human head is roughly cut out of the rock in the first chamber of the tomb, out of which two square loculi open.”

References

Bibliography

External links
Yarine, Localiban
Survey of Western Palestine, Map 3:  IAA, Wikimedia commons

Populated places in Tyre District
Sunni Muslim communities in Lebanon